Dalyellup, (pronounced Dal-yellup), is an outer northern suburb of the Shire of Capel local government area. The suburb was established in 1999 when the Department of Housing and Works entered into a joint venture with Satterley Property Group to develop Dalyellup Beach Estate, a master-planned community which was expected to yield 3,000 lots by its completion in 2012.

In the original advertising campaign, Dalyellup was heavily promoted as "A village in the Forest by the Sea".

Facilities

A small shopping centre provides for daily needs, but most residents used Bunbury's shopping facilities, until the new shopping centre opened in 2015.

The placement of a larger shopping centre was implemented due to the rapidly increasing population.

Dalyellup also has a large 106-room aged care and community housing project, managed by a local aged care provider. The facility, known as Bethanie Dalyellup, takes over-55's from the Department of Housing. It was officially opened on 10 October 2011 by Western Australian Senator Louise Pratt.

Education
There are three public schools in the area, Dalyellup Primary School, Tuart Forest Primary School, and Dalyellup College. Dalyellup Primary School opened in 2001 in the local shopping centre with 91 students, moving into its own premises in April 2004. In 2009 Dalyellup Secondary College (later Dalyellup College) was established and the primary school and college became a two-campus school, later separating in 2013. Bunbury Tuart Forest Primary School was established in 2013. Baptist College was established in 2019, previously on the site of Ocean Forest Lutheran College.

Transport
Dalyellup is served by the 842 bus route from Park's Centre Shopping Centre, Carey Park and 843 route from Bunbury's central bus station, terminating at the end of Norton Promenade on the coast with a journey time of approximately 35 minutes. The route is operated by TransBunbury for the Public Transport Authority.

Waste dump controversy
In 2009 it was reported that a titanium dioxide refining company called Millennium Inorganic Chemicals had been dumping waste at a Dalyellup site for the past two decades. Residents had been calling for the closure of the site because of concerns over the impact of the waste and its proximity to a residential estate.  Two councillors resigned in protest when the Capel council voted to give the waste facility permission to continue dumping waste for another three years, and calls to close the site continued.

References

External links

 Dalyellup Beach homepage (Satterley)
 Greater Bunbury Region Scheme (EPA report) contains some information about vegetation in Dalyellup.

Suburbs of Bunbury, Western Australia